Karen Lam is a Canadian director, writer and producer. She is known for the horror film Evangeline (2013).

Life and career
Karen Lam grew up in Brandon, Manitoba. Lam's father, a professor, would show his daughter horror films that she cites as an influence for her work.  Lam also lists Gothic literature and Asian horror films as influences.

After receiving a law degree from the University of British Columbia, Lam began working at BC Film. From there she started producing films which lead to writing and directing. Lam's first featured-length film was Stained (2010), a thriller starring Tinsel Korey. A year later the horror revenge short Doll Parts (2011) was released and distributed, which Lam credits for paving the way for Stained to get viewership in the United States.

Evangeline

Karen Lam wrote and directed Evangeline, a revenge horror film based on the Pickton murders, and the Highway of Tears murders in British Columbia, as well as violence against women in general. It stars Kat de Lieva as a university student seeking revenge against those who beat her. At the 2013 Blood in the Snow Canadian Film Festival the film won Best Cinematography, and for Lam, Best Director.

Filmography

References

External links
 

Film directors from Manitoba
Canadian women film directors
Horror film directors
Living people
Year of birth missing (living people)
Asian-Canadian filmmakers
University of British Columbia alumni
Canadian women screenwriters